King Edward Park may refer to:

Places

Australia
  King Edward Park, Brisbane, Queensland
 King Edward Park, East Maitland, New South Wales
 King Edward Park, Glen Innes, New South Wales
 King Edward Park, Newcastle, New South Wales

Canada
 King Edward Park, Edmonton in Edmonton, Alberta

United Kingdom

England
 King Edward Memorial Park in Shadwell, London, England